This is the results breakdown of the local elections held in Andalusia on 28 May 1995. The following tables show detailed results in the autonomous community's most populous municipalities, sorted alphabetically.

Overall

City control
The following table lists party control in the most populous municipalities, including provincial capitals (shown in bold). Gains for a party are displayed with the cell's background shaded in that party's colour.

Municipalities

Alcalá de Guadaíra
Population: 54,529

Algeciras
Population: 103,787

Almería
Population: 167,361

Antequera
Population: 39,842

Benalmádena
Population: 24,706

Cádiz
Population: 155,438

Chiclana de la Frontera
Population: 50,697

Córdoba
Population: 315,948

Dos Hermanas
Population: 82,814

Écija
Population: 37,267

El Ejido
Population: 44,373

El Puerto de Santa María
Population: 69,656

Fuengirola
Population: 42,605

Granada
Population: 271,180

Huelva
Population: 145,049

Jaén
Population: 112,772

Jerez de la Frontera
Population: 186,273

La Línea de la Concepción
Population: 61,280

Linares
Population: 61,642

Málaga
Population: 531,443

Marbella
Population: 86,013

Morón de la Frontera
Population: 29,408

Motril
Population: 48,984

Ronda
Population: 34,575

San Fernando
Population: 87,588

Sanlúcar de Barrameda
Population: 59,780

Seville

Population: 714,148

Utrera
Population: 45,008

Vélez-Málaga
Population: 54,327

References

Andalusia
1995